The men's 400 metres at the 2022 Commonwealth Games, as part of the athletics programme, took place in the Alexander Stadium on 3, 5 and 7 August 2022.

Records
Prior to this competition, the existing world and Games records were as follows:

Schedule
The schedule was as follows:

All times are British Summer Time (UTC+1)

Results

First round
First 3 in each heat (Q) and the next 3 fastest (q) advance to the Semifinals.

Semifinals
First 2 in each heat (Q) and the next 2 fastest (q) advance to the Final.

Final
The medals were determined in the final.

References

Men's 400 metres
2022